The 2022 All Japan University Football Championship (第71回 全日本大学サッカー選手権大会; All Japan 71st University Football Championship) was the 71st edition of the referred annually contested cup for universities across Japan. As usual, the tournament was contested by 24 universities on a knockout-stage format. The Komazawa University were the current champions, winning 3–2 past Hannan University on the 2021 championship. However, as they didn't qualify for this edition, the university was unable to defend their title. The Toin University of Yokohama took advantage of it, winning the championship by a 3–2 win after a last-minute goal against Niigata University of Health and Welfare. They won the championship for the first time.

Calendar

Venues
The venues and their locations are as follows:

Participating clubs
In parenthesis: Each university's performance at the regional qualifying series.

Schedule
The participating teams and match-ups were disclosed on 22 November 2022.

First round

Round of 16

Quarter-finals

Semi-finals

Final

Top scorers
.

Awards

See also
2022 All Japan Women's University Football Championship
2022 All Japan High School Soccer Tournament
2022 All Japan High School Women's Soccer Tournament

References

External links
About the tournament
Schedule and results

Football competitions in Japan
Youth football competitions
2022 in Japanese football